This is a list of mayors of Terre Haute, Indiana.

Town of Terre Haute

"On Feb. 9, 1843, the office of Mayor was abolished by a special act of the Legislature in 1843, the president of the common council administered mayoral duties until the city was incorporated in 1853. Under the new constitution of the State of Indiana, a General Law was approved on June 18, 1852, providing for the incorporation of cities."

City of Terre Haute

See also
Terre Haute, Indiana

References

 
 . "Photograph of a plaque containing the names, dates, and political parties of mayors of Terre Haute, Indiana through 2004." Covers 1838-2004.

 
Terre Haute